Margaret Keyes Groos (born September 21, 1959) is a retired long-distance runner from the United States.

Groos was born and raised in Nashville, Tennessee, where she graduated from Harpeth Hall School in 1977. As a ninth grader, she set the national record for the 880 yard run (2:10.06). As a senior, she set a state record in the 1600 meters (4:45.44) that wasn't broken for 40 years. Overall, she won state championships in the 880 yard and the mile run three times, each, while being part of a state champion mile relay and twice being part of Harpeth Hall's state championship team (and being part of their runner-up team another year).

She was recruited to the University of Virginia. In 1981, she set a world indoor record for the 5000 meter run.

Groos competed in the marathon at the 1988 Summer Olympics in Seoul, Korea, and was an alternate for the 1984 Olympic Games. She twice won the Pittsburgh Marathon, including in 1988, when she ran her personal best (2:29:50).

Personal
Groos is married to Paul Sloan. They have two children. Their daughter, Emma, won the Tennessee state cross country championship in 2014 (18:36.25); earlier in high school, she'd finished 4th, 3rd, and then 2nd in the state championships.

Achievements
All results regarding marathon, unless stated otherwise

On February 20, 1981, at Blacksburg VA Groos set a world indoor record for 5000 meters.  Her time was 15:34.5.

References

External links
 

1959 births
Living people
Sportspeople from Nashville, Tennessee
Track and field athletes from Tennessee
American female long-distance runners
American female marathon runners
American female cross country runners
Olympic track and field athletes of the United States
Athletes (track and field) at the 1988 Summer Olympics
21st-century American women